Ulysses Lee "Junior" Bridgeman (born September 17, 1953) is an American businessman and former professional basketball player. Bridgeman played in the National Basketball League (NBA) for twelve years from 1975 until 1987, beginning with the Milwaukee Bucks. Bridgeman is the current owner of Ebony and Jet magazines. Despite never making more than $350,000 a season during his NBA career, Bridgeman has a net worth of over $600 million, making him one of the wealthiest former athletes in the world.

Career

High school career
Born in East Chicago, Indiana, Bridgeman was a member of the 1971 Washington High School Senators basketball team, which went undefeated (29–0) and won the Indiana state high school basketball championship. Among his teammates were his brother Sam, Pete Trgovich (who played at UCLA) and Tim Stoddard (N.C. State), who would go on to have success as a Major League Baseball pitcher.

College career
Bridgeman was the Missouri Valley Conference Player of the Year in 1974 and 1975. Bridgeman led the Louisville Cardinals to the 1974 NCAA Division I Basketball Tournament as a junior. As a senior, he led the Cardinals to the Final Four of the 1975 NCAA Division I Basketball Tournament, where they lost the eventual NCAA Champion UCLA 75–74 in the National Semi-Final. In his collegiate career at Louisville, Bridgeman averaged 15.5 points, 7.6 rebounds and 2.7 assists in 87 career games.

NBA career
Bridgeman was drafted by the Los Angeles Lakers in the 1975 NBA draft in the first round (#8 overall pick). On June 16, 1975, almost three weeks after the draft, Bridgeman was involved in a landmark trade. Bridgeman was traded by the Los Angeles Lakers with David Meyers, Elmore Smith and Brian Winters to the Milwaukee Bucks for Kareem Abdul-Jabbar and Walt Wesley. As a rookie with Milwaukee in 1975–1976 under coach Larry Costello, Bridgeman averaged 8.6 points, 3.6 rebounds and 1.9 assists. In 1976–1977, Costello was fired by Milwaukee after a 3–15 start and assistant coach Don Nelson, who had been a player for the 1976 NBA champion Boston Celtics the year before, was hired as coach. Bridgeman improved, averaging 14.4 points, 5.1 rebounds and 2.5 assists. On December 15, 1976, Bridgeman scored a career-high 41 points in a 129–125 loss against Boston. Nelson and Bridgeman would remain together for the next eight seasons.

Bridgeman was utilized by coach Nelson as a complement to teammates Bob Dandridge, Marques Johnson, Sidney Moncrief, Bob Lanier, Quinn Buckner, Myers, Winters and Mickey Johnson during his Milwaukee tenure, as the Bucks had powerful teams, winning several division titles (1980, 1981, 1982, 1983, 1984).

On April 5, 1981, Bridgeman scored a career playoff-high 32 points and recorded 6 assists in a Game 1 Eastern Conference Semifinals loss to the Philadelphia 76ers. After nine seasons in Milwaukee, on September 29, 1984, Bridgeman was traded by the Milwaukee Bucks with Harvey Catchings, Marques Johnson and cash to the Los Angeles Clippers for Terry Cummings, Craig Hodges and Ricky Pierce. On January 29, 1985, Bridgeman scored 30 points in a loss against the Cleveland Cavaliers. After spending two years in Los Angeles, he returned to Milwaukee for one more season before retiring in 1987. He played in 711 games for the Bucks, still the most in franchise history. In his 12-year NBA career, Bridgeman scored 11,517 total points.

He was a sixth man for most of his career, averaging double figures in scoring for nine consecutive seasons. Some believe that if the NBA Sixth Man of the Year Award was created before the 1982–83 season, Bridgeman may have won it multiple times. In his career with the Milwaukee Bucks (1975–1984, 1986–1987) and the Los Angeles Clippers (1984–1986), Bridgeman played in 849 total NBA games, averaging 13.6 points, 3.5 rebounds and 2.6 assists, shooting 47% from the floor and 84% from the line.

Bridgeman also served as the president of the National Basketball Players association from 1985 to 1988. Bridgeman resigned after the 1988 CBA and the controversy of the Junior Bridgeman antitrust lawsuit, which NBA players indicted the NBA of violation of antitrust laws by compensating to eschew from matching offers for free agents and abuse of the salary cap that led to a decrease of the total players' gross revenues from 61 percent to 54 percent from the 1983–84 season.

Corporate career
During the off-seasons of his playing career, Bridgeman worked and learned the business model of Wendy's fast food restaurant franchise. After retiring from the NBA, he invested in the franchise and eventually owned over 100 various Wendy's and Chili's restaurants, before selling in 2016. As President and CEO of Bridgeman Foods Inc, in 2017, Bridgeman became a bottler for The Coca-Cola Company, and in 2018, he signed a letter of intent to buy bottling operations in Canada. In December 2020, Bridgeman, via Bridgeman Sports and Media, bought Ebony and Jet for $14 million after the magazines had declared bankruptcy earlier in the year. On May 26, 2022, Manna Capital Partners, an investment firm cofounded by Bridgeman, announced that the firm had partnered with Ball Corporation to construct an operate an integrated secondary aluminum mill in Los Lunas, New Mexico. On October 18, 2022, Alabama Governor Kay Ivey announced that Manna Capital Partners would invest in a bottling facility to be located in Hope Hull, Alabama and operated by affiliate Manna Beverages & Ventures.

NBA career statistics

Regular season

|-
| align="left" | 1975–76
| align="left" | Milwaukee
| 81 || - || 20.3 || .439 || - || .795 || 3.6 || 1.9 || 0.6 || 0.3 || 8.6
|-
| align="left" | 1976–77
| align="left" | Milwaukee
| 82 || - || 29.4 || .449 || .000 || .864 || 5.1 || 2.5 || 1.0 || 0.3 || 14.4
|-
| align="left" | 1977–78
| align="left" | Milwaukee
| 82 || - || 22.9 || .503 || .000 || .810 || 3.5 || 2.1 || 0.9 || 0.4 || 13.6
|-
| align="left" | 1978–79
| align="left" | Milwaukee
| 82 || - || 23.9 || .506 || .000 || .829 || 3.6 || 2.0 || 1.1 || 0.5 || 15.5
|-
| align="left" | 1979–80
| align="left" | Milwaukee
| 81 || - || 28.6 || .478 || .185 || .865 || 3.7 || 2.9 || 1.2 || 0.2 || 17.6
|-
| align="left" | 1980–81
| align="left" | Milwaukee
| 77 || - || 28.8 || .487 || .143 || .884 || 3.8 || 3.0 || 1.1 || 0.4 || 16.8
|-
| align="left" | 1981–82
| align="left" | Milwaukee
| 41 || 4 || 22.5 || .483 || .444 || .864 || 3.0 || 2.7 || 0.7 || 0.1 || 12.5
|-
| align="left" | 1982–83
| align="left" | Milwaukee
| 70 || 5 || 26.5 || .492 || .077 || .837 || 3.5 || 3.0 || 0.6 || 0.1 || 14.4
|-
| align="left" | 1983–84
| align="left" | Milwaukee
| 81 || 10 || 30.0 || .465 || .194 || .807 || 4.1 || 3.3 || 0.7 || 0.2 || 15.1
|-
| align="left" | 1984–85
| align="left" | Los Angeles
| 80 || 15 || 25.5 || .465 || .359 || .879 || 2.9 || 2.1 || 0.6 || 0.2 || 13.9
|-
| align="left" | 1985–86
| align="left" | Los Angeles
| 58 || 14 || 20.0 || .441 || .333 || .891 || 2.1 || 1.9 || 0.5 || 0.1 || 8.8
|-
| align="left" | 1986–87
| align="left" | Milwaukee
| 34 || 4 || 12.3 || .462 || .167 || .800 || 1.5 || 1.0 || 0.3 || 0.1 || 5.1
|- class="sortbottom"
| style="text-align:center;" colspan="2"| Career
| 849 || 52 || 25.0 || .475 || .244 || .846 || 3.5 || 2.4 || 0.8 || 0.3 || 13.6
|}

Playoffs

|-
| align="left" | 1975–76
| align="left" | Milwaukee
| 3 || - || 22.3 || .450 || - || .636 || 3.7 || 1.7 || 0.3 || 0.0 || 8.3
|-
| align="left" | 1977–78
| align="left" | Milwaukee
| 9 || - || 19.8 || .484 || - || .750 || 2.0 || 1.2 || 1.0 || 0.2 || 10.4
|-
| align="left" | 1979–80
| align="left" | Milwaukee
| 5 || - || 24.8 || .357 || .000 || .733 || 3.8 || 3.4 || 1.0 || 0.4 || 10.2
|-
| align="left" | 1980–81
| align="left" | Milwaukee
| 7 || - || 26.1 || .462 || 1.000 || .813 || 2.1 || 3.3 || 0.9 || 0.0 || 14.0
|-
| align="left" | 1982–83
| align="left" | Milwaukee
| 9 || - || 34.2 || .469 || .400 || .933 || 5.0 || 3.1 || 1.1 || 0.2 || 16.9
|-
| align="left" | 1983–84
| align="left" | Milwaukee
| 16 || - || 31.2 || .456 || .111 || .815 || 4.0 || 2.8 || 0.4 || 0.3 || 14.4
|- class="sortbottom"
| style="text-align:center;" colspan="2"| Career
| 49 || - || 27.7 || .454 || .250 || .814 || 3.5 || 2.6 || 0.8 || 0.2 || 13.3
|}

Personal
Bridgeman is a member of Alpha Phi Alpha fraternity. In 2008, the PGA of America appointed Bridgeman to serve on the PGA Board of Directors. The Naismith Basketball Hall of Fame appointed Bridgeman to the board of governors in 2010. Churchill Downs Inc. appointed Bridgeman to the company's board of directors in 2012. In 2016–2017 Bridgeman was appointed and served on the University of Louisville Board of Trustees. Bridgeman is also a key member of the Simmons College of Kentucky Board of Trustees.

Bridgeman has been honored numerous times at Bucks games since his retirement, and makes regular appearances at Bucks games for bobblehead nights and autograph signings during charity donation-drive events.

Bridgeman is a member of the Louisville megachurch Southeast Christian Church. In 2016, Forbes ranked Bridgeman the fourth-wealthiest retired athlete in the world behind only Michael Jordan, David Beckham and Arnold Palmer with an estimated income of $32 million.

On the Bucks’ appearance in the 2021 NBA Finals, and recalling his Bucks teams repeated Eastern Conference Finals losses, Bridgeman said "You know, we all wore the same jersey at some point in time. So, you feel a relationship there and you know, so much admiration for the guys that are able to get to the Finals. You know, that was our dream of ours and unfortunately, we ran into a couple of guys in Boston and Philly at the time, but they've been able to do it and just wishing them all the luck in the world."

Honors
 Bridgeman's no. 2 jersey was retired by the Milwaukee Bucks in 1988.
 In 1999, Bridgeman was inducted into the Wisconsin Athletic Hall of Fame.
 Bridgeman was inducted into the University of Louisville College of Arts and Sciences Hall of Fame in 2007.
 In 2009, Bridgeman was inducted into the Missouri Valley Conference Hall of Fame.
 In 2014, Bridgeman was inducted into the Kentucky Entrepreneur Hall of Fame.
 In 2019, Bridgeman received the Gold Cup award from Greater Louisville Inc. in honor of his business contributions and community involvement.

References

External links
 
 Profile at the Bucks' website

1953 births
Living people
African-American basketball players
African-American businesspeople
All-American college men's basketball players
American businesspeople
Basketball players from Indiana
Los Angeles Clippers announcers
Los Angeles Clippers players
Los Angeles Lakers draft picks
Louisville Cardinals men's basketball players
Members of the Christian churches and churches of Christ
Milwaukee Bucks players
National Basketball Association players with retired numbers
Sportspeople from East Chicago, Indiana
Shooting guards
Small forwards
American men's basketball players
National Basketball Players Association presidents
21st-century African-American people
20th-century African-American sportspeople